This is a list of the endemic amphibian species recorded in Papua New Guinea.

Species

Ceratobatrachidae
Cornufer adiastolus
Cornufer admiraltiensis, Admiralty wrinkled ground frog
Cornufer akarithymus, Pomugu wrinkled ground frog
Cornufer boulengeri, Boulenger's wrinkled ground frog
Cornufer citrinospilus
Cornufer elegans
Cornufer exedrus
Cornufer gigas
Cornufer gilliardi, Gilliard's wrinkled ground frog
Cornufer latro, Manus wrinkled ground frog
Cornufer macrosceles, Ti wrinkled ground frog
Cornufer magnus, Kavieng wrinkled ground frog
Cornufer malukuna
Cornufer mamusiorum, Mamusi wrinkled ground frog
Cornufer mediodiscus
Cornufer minutus
Cornufer montanus
Cornufer nakanaiorum, Nakanai wrinkled ground frog
Cornufer nexipus, Baining wrinkled ground frog
Cornufer schmidti, Schmidt's wrinkled ground frog
Cornufer sulcatus
Cornufer vogti
Platymantis browni, Brown's wrinkled ground frog
Platymantis bufonulus
Platymantis caesiops
Platymantis macrops, Aresi wrinkled ground frog
Platymantis manus
Platymantis mimicus, Numundo wrinkled ground frog
Platymantis myersi, Myers' wrinkled ground frog
Platymantis parkeri, Parker's wrinkled ground frog

Hylidae
Litoria albolabris, Wandolleck's white-lipped tree frog
Litoria auae
Litoria becki, Beck's tree frog
Litoria bibonius
Litoria bulmeri, Bulmer's tree frog
Litoria callista
Litoria chloristona
Litoria chrisdahli
Litoria contrastens, Barabuna tree frog
Litoria darlingtoni, Darlington's Madang tree frog
Litoria dorsalis, dwarf rocket frog
Litoria dorsivena, eastern mountains tree frog
Litoria eschata
Litoria exophthalmia
Litoria flavescens
Litoria graminea, northern New Guinea tree frog
Litoria hilli
Litoria hunti
Litoria impura, southern New Guinea tree frog
Litoria jeudii
Litoria kumae
Litoria leucova, West Sepik tree frog
Litoria lodesdema
Litoria louisiadensis, Rossell tree frog
Litoria majikthise
Litoria multiplica, Kassam tree frog
Litoria nullicedens
Litoria oenicolen, Trauna River tree frog
Litoria ollauro
Litoria pallidofemora
Litoria pronimia
Litoria prora, Efogi tree frog
Litoria robinsonae
Litoria rubrops
Litoria sauroni
Litoria singadanae
Litoria spartacus
Litoria spinifera, spiny tree frog
Litoria timida, Menemsorae tree frog
Litoria vocivincens, Brown River tree frog
Nyctimystes avocalis, loud big-eyed tree frog
Nyctimystes bivocalis
Nyctimystes calcaratus
Nyctimystes cheesmani, Cheesman's big-eyed tree frog
Nyctimystes cryptochrysos
Nyctimystes daymani, Dayman big-eyed tree frog
Nyctimystes disruptus, Madang big-eyed tree frog
Nyctimystes eucavatus
Nyctimystes foricula, Kaironk big-eyed tree frog
Nyctimystes gularis, Mondo big-eyed tree frog
Nyctimystes intercastellus
Nyctimystes kubori, sandy big-eyed tree frog
Nyctimystes kuduki
Nyctimystes latratus
Nyctimystes myolae
Nyctimystes narinosus, common big-eyed tree frog
Nyctimystes obsoletus, Simbang big-eyed tree frog
Nyctimystes ocreptus
Nyctimystes papua, Papua big-eyed tree frog
Nyctimystes perimetri, archipelago big-eyed tree frog
Nyctimystes persimilis, Milne big-eyed tree frog
Nyctimystes semipalmatus, Kokoda big-eyed tree frog
Nyctimystes trachydermis, Morobe big-eyed tree frog
Nyctimystes traunae
Nyctimystes tyleri
Nyctimystes zweifeli, Zweifel's big-eyed tree frog

Microhylidae
Aphantophryne minuta, Myola New Guinea frog
Aphantophryne pansa, Scratchley New Guinea frog
Aphantophryne sabini, Guest House New Guinea frog
Asterophrys leucopus, Stolle New Guinea bush frog
Austrochaperina adamantina, Nibo land frog
Austrochaperina alexanderi, Alexander's land frog
Austrochaperina aquilonia, Somoro land frog
Austrochaperina archboldi, Archbold's land frog
Austrochaperina brevipes, Victoria land frog
Austrochaperina guttata, spotted land frog
Austrochaperina hooglandi, Hoogland's land frog
Austrochaperina laurae, Laura's land frog
Austrochaperina mehelyi, Mehely's land frog
Austrochaperina novaebritanniae, New Britain land frog
Austrochaperina palmipes, Dayman land frog
Austrochaperina parkeri, Parker's land frog
Austrochaperina polysticta, Morobe land frog
Austrochaperina rivularis, Finalbin land frog
Austrochaperina septentrionalis, northern land frog
Austrochaperina yelaensis, Yela land frog
Barygenys apodasta
Barygenys atra, Gunther's Papua frog
Barygenys cheesmanae, Cheesman's Papua frog
Barygenys exsul, Zwefel's Papua frog
Barygenys flavigularis, yellow-throated Papua frog
Barygenys maculata, spotted Papua frog
Barygenys nana, Highland Papua frog
Barygenys parvula, Madang Papua frog
Barygenys resima
Callulops comptus, ornate callulops frog
Callulops doriae, Doria's callulops frog
Callulops eremnosphax
Callulops glandulosus, warty callulops frog
Callulops humicola, Kotuni callulops frog
Callulops marmoratus, marbled callulops frog
Callulops mediodiscus
Callulops microtis
Callulops omnistriatus
Callulops robustus, robust callulops frog
Callulops sagittatus, Binnie callulops frog
Callulops stictogaster, Irumbofoie callulops frog
Callulops wilhelmanus, Wilhelm callulops frog
Choerophryne allisoni, Allison's mountain frog
Choerophryne alpestris
Choerophryne bickfordi
Choerophryne brevicrus
Choerophryne brunhildae, Adelbert rainforest frog
Choerophryne bryonopsis
Choerophryne burtoni, Burton's mountain frog
Choerophryne darlingtoni, Darlington's rainforest frog
Choerophryne epirrhina
Choerophryne exclamitans
Choerophryne fafniri, mid-montane rainforest frog
Choerophryne gracilirostris
Choerophryne grylloides
Choerophryne gudrunae, Kowat rainforest frog
Choerophryne gunnari, Gunnar's rainforest frog
Choerophryne longirostris, Menawa mountain frog
Choerophryne murrita
Choerophryne pandanicola
Choerophryne rhenaurum, Moiyok rainforest frog
Choerophryne rostellifer, Torricelli mountain frog
Choerophryne sanguinopicta, Mount Simpson rainforest frog
Choerophryne siegfriedi, Siegfried's rainforest frog
Choerophryne swanhildae, Southern Highlands rainforest frog
Choerophryne tubercula, warty rainforest frog
Choerophryne valkuriarum, Hidden Valley rainforest frog
Cophixalus albolineatus
Cophixalus amabilis
Cophixalus ateles, Papua rainforest frog
Cophixalus bewaniensis, Menawa rainforest frog
Cophixalus caverniphilus
Cophixalus cheesmanae, Kokoda rainforest frog
Cophixalus clapporum
Cophixalus cryptotympanum, Zweifel's rainforest frog
Cophixalus cupricarenus
Cophixalus daymani, Dayman rainforest frog
Cophixalus desticans
Cophixalus interruptus
Cophixalus iovaorum
Cophixalus kaindiensis, Kaindi rainforest frog
Cophixalus kethuk
Cophixalus linnaeus
Cophixalus melanops
Cophixalus misimae, Misima rainforest frog
Cophixalus nexipus
Cophixalus nubicola, Michael rainforest frog
Cophixalus parkeri, Parker's rainforest frog
Cophixalus phaeobalius
Cophixalus pipilans, sempi rainforest frog
Cophixalus pulchellus, pretty rainforest frog
Cophixalus riparius, Wilhelm rainforest frog
Cophixalus shellyi, Shelly's rainforest frog
Cophixalus sphagnicola, Morobe rainforest frog
Cophixalus tagulensis, Tagula rainforest frog
Cophixalus tenuidactylus
Cophixalus timidus, Simpson rainforest frog
Cophixalus tomaiodactylus
Cophixalus variabilis, Pekopekowana rainforest frog
Cophixalus verecundus, Myola rainforest frog
Cophixalus verrucosus, Oroke rainforest frog
Cophixalus viridis, green rainforest frog
Cophixalus wempi
Copiula annanoreenae, Anna Noreen's Mehely frog
Copiula fistulans, Lae Mehely frog
Copiula lennarti, Lennart's Mehely frog
Copiula minor, Milne Bay Mehely frog
Copiula oxyrhina, Misima Mehely frog
Genyophryne thomsoni, Thomson's toothless frog
Hylophorbus atrifasciatus
Hylophorbus infulata
Hylophorbus proekes, Richard's Mawatta frog
Hylophorbus rainerguentheri, Huon Mawatta frog
Hylophorbus richardsi
Hylophorbus sigridae, Sigrid's Mawatta frog
Liophryne allisoni, Morobe land frog
Liophryne dentata, Alotau land frog
Liophryne magnitympanum
Liophryne miniafia
Liophryne rhododactyla, Owen Stanley land frog
Liophryne rubra, ruddy land frog
Liophryne similis, Myola land frog
Mantophryne axanthogaster
Mantophryne insignis
Mantophryne louisiadensis, Louisiade Archipelago frog
Mantophryne menziesi, Iarowari school frog
Metamagnusia slateri, Slater's callulops frog
Oreophryne albomaculata, speckled cross frog
Oreophryne ampelos
Oreophryne anamiatoi
Oreophryne anser
Oreophryne anthonyi, Anthony's cross frog
Oreophryne aurora
Oreophryne banshee
Oreophryne brachypus, Gazelle cross frog
Oreophryne brunnea
Oreophryne cameroni
Oreophryne curator, Minder's cross frog
Oreophryne equus
Oreophryne ezra
Oreophryne flavomaculata
Oreophryne gagneorum
Oreophryne geislerorum, Madang cross frog
Oreophryne geminus, twin cross frog
Oreophryne graminus
Oreophryne hypsiops, sempi cross frog
Oreophryne inornata, dull cross frog
Oreophryne insulana, Goodenough cross frog
Oreophryne kampeni, Moroka cross frog
Oreophryne lemur
Oreophryne loriae, Port Moresby cross frog
Oreophryne matawan
Oreophryne meliades
Oreophryne notata, Ialibu cross frog
Oreophryne oviprotector
Oreophryne parkopanorum
Oreophryne penelopeia
Oreophryne philosylleptoris
Oreophryne phoebe
Oreophryne picticrus
Oreophryne pseudunicolor
Oreophryne streiffeleri
Oreophryne terrestris, terrestrial cross frog
Oreophryne wolterstorffi, Wolterstorff's cross frog
Oxydactyla alpestris, Gomgale land frog
Oxydactyla coggeri, Kaironk land frog
Oxydactyla crassa, Papua land frog
Oxydactyla stenodactyla, Piunde-Aunde land frog
Paedophryne amauensis
Paedophryne dekot
Paedophryne kathismaphlox
Paedophryne oyatabu
Paedophryne swiftorum
Paedophryne verrucosa
Xenorhina arboricola
Xenorhina brachyrhyncha
Xenorhina fuscigula, Kaironk fanged frog
Xenorhina huon, Morobe fanged frog
Xenorhina mehelyi, Mehely's fanged frog
Xenorhina subcrocea, Lae fanged frog
Xenorhina tillacki, Tillack's snouted frog
Xenorhina tumulus, Madang fanged frog
Xenorhina zweifeli, Zweifel's fanged frog

Myobatrachidae
Mixophyes hihihorlo, Namosado barred frog

Ranidae
Papurana milneana, Milne Bay frog
Papurana supragrisea, Papua gray frog
Papurana waliesa

See also
Fauna of New Guinea
List of endemic reptiles of Papua New Guinea
List of endemic fish of Papua New Guinea
List of birds of Papua New Guinea
List of butterflies of Papua New Guinea
List of mammals of Papua New Guinea

References

 
Papua New Guinea
Amphibians
Endemic fauna of Papua New Guinea
Papua New Guinea